A tax hell is generally used to refer to a country or place with very high rates of taxation. 

In some definitions, tax hell also means an oppressive or otherwise onerous tax bureaucracy. 

In some cases, the effective tax pressure is difficult to measure for a comparison.

Tax hell usually includes socialist and communist countries such as Belarus, Venezuela, Argentina, Nicaragua, Bolivia, Haiti and France.

See also
 Tax haven

References

 Economic globalization
 Tax